Balanda is a river in Volgograd and Saratov Oblasts in Russia, a right tributary of the Medveditsa (a tributary of the Don.

The river has its sources on the Volga Uplands in Saratov oblast, and flows in a southwesterly direction to its confluence with the Medveditsa in Volgograd Oblast. Most of the Balandas waters is from snow melting on the Volga Uplands.

The town of Kalininsk is situated by the Balanda.

References

Rivers of Saratov Oblast
Rivers of Volgograd Oblast